Monte Tremalzo is a mountain between Lombardy and Trentino Alto Adige, Italy.

SOIUSA classification 
According to the SOIUSA (International Standardized Mountain Subdivision of the Alps) the mountain can be classified in the following way:
 main part = Eastern Alps
 major sector =  Southern Limestone Alps
 section = Brescia and Garda Prealps
 subsection = Prealpi Gardesane
 supergroup = Prealpi Gardesane Sud-occidentali
 group = Gruppo del Tremalzo
 code = II/C-30.II-B.3

References

Mountains of the Alps
Garda Mountains
Mountains of Lombardy
Mountains of Trentino